Enterprise Ireland is an Irish state economic development agency focused on helping Irish-owned business deliver new export sales.

History
Enterprise Ireland was established by the Industrial Development (Enterprise Ireland) Act 1998, superseding two earlier bodies:  Forbairt and An Bord Tráchtála. Forbairt was established in 1993 as part of Forfás, to make industrial development grants, while An Bord Tráchtála was established in 1991 through the merger of the Irish Goods Council and Córas Tráchtala — a statutory body founded in 1959 to market Irish goods abroad  — and successor of Córas Tráchtála Teoranta, founded in 1951. The Irish Goods Council was founded to market Irish goods in Ireland in 1974, originally within the National Development Association as the Working Group on the Promotion and Sale of Irish Goods; in 1978 it was spun out and merged with Vivian Murray's private National Development Council as a limited company.

Operations

Support for companies
Enterprise Ireland provides financial support and advice to Irish technology companies, helping them promote goods and services in international markets, with specific focus on the software sector.

Applied Research Enhancement Program
Applied Research Enhancement (ARE) Centres are funded by Enterprise Ireland with the purpose of providing specialised expertise, research and development capabilities and access to state of the art equipment to companies. Companies may engage with AREs under a number of EI funded opportunities including EI vouchers and Innovation Partnerships.

The AREs are divided sectorally into ICT and Software, Bio-Life Sciences and Pharmaceuticals, and Bio-medical Devices and Materials.

The ICT and Software Sector AREs are:
Centre for Affective Solutions for Ambient Living Awareness (CASALA) located at Dundalk Institute of Technology
Centre for Converged IP Communications Services (3CS) located at Waterford Institute of Technology
Technologies for Embedded Computing (TEC) located at Cork Institute of Technology
IMaR Technology Gateway (IMaR) located at the Institute of Technology, Tralee 
Seamless Use Through Abstraction Technologies (SUNAT) located at Athlone Institute of Technology
Wireless Sensor Applied Research (WiSAR Lab) located at Letterkenny Institute of Technology

The Bio Life Sciences and Pharmaceuticals Sector AREs are:
Ion Channel Biotechnology Centre (ICBC) located at Dundalk Institute of Technology
Pharmaceutical and Molecular Biotechnology Research Centre (PMBRC) located at Waterford Institute of Technology
Shannon Applied Biotechnology Centre (SABC) located at the Institute of Technology, Tralee and Limerick Institute of Technology

The Biomedical Devices and Materials Sector AREs are:
Centre for Research in Engineering Surface Coatings (CREST) located at Dublin Institute of Technology
Micro Sensors for Clinical Analysis (MiCRA) located at Institute of Technology, Tallaght
South Eastern Applied Materials Research Centre (SEAM) located at Waterford Institute of Technology
Centre for Advanced Photonics and Process Control (CAPPA) located at Cork Institute of Technology
Medical Engineering Design and Innovation Centre (MEDIC) located at Cork Institute of Technology

Other programmes
Enterprise Platform Programmes (EPP) were business incubator programmes run under the remit of Enterprise Ireland to meet the needs of Irish entrepreneurs in a business start-up situation. The Enterprise Platform Programme was replaced by the "New Frontiers" programme in February 2012.

See also
 County and City Enterprise Board

References

External links

Business organisations based in the Republic of Ireland
Economy of the Republic of Ireland
Government agencies of the Republic of Ireland
1998 establishments in Ireland
Irish companies established in 1998
Department of Enterprise, Trade and Employment